Alizé Cornet was the defending champion, but withdrew before the tournament began due to a back injury.

Elise Mertens won her first WTA singles title, defeating Monica Niculescu in the final, 6–3, 6–1. Mertens had come through the qualifying tournament and thus became only the third qualifier to win the Hobart International, following Mona Barthel in 2012 and Garbiñe Muguruza in 2014.

Seeds

Draw

Finals

Top half

Bottom half

Qualifying

Seeds

Qualifiers

Lucky losers

Draw

First qualifier

Second qualifier

Third qualifier

Fourth qualifier

See also
 2017 Australian Open Series

References
 Main Draw
 Qualifying Draw

W